The Communist is a 1957 Soviet drama film directed by Yuli Raizman. The Communist is one of the classic films of Soviet cinema. This is a story about an ordinary communist, a participant in one of the first Soviet construction projects, selflessly devoted to the cause. At that time, the film was innovative; director Julius Reisman managed to create not stilted, not flat, and multifaceted, complex image of the Builder of communism.

Story 
The film takes place in 1919. Young communist Vasily Gubanov came to the construction of the power plant-the most important object for the young Republic. A demobilized communist front-line soldier Vasily Gubanov was in charge of the warehouse at the construction site of the power plant in Shatura and gave his work completely, from the outside it even seemed that such zeal in hard work was beyond human capabilities. And if the locomotive stopped because of lack of fuel, Vasily Gubanov one rushed to cut down the wood. And also, with full dedication, fiercely and selflessly, Vasily Gubanov knew how to love, but his life ended too soon.

Cast 
 Yevgeni Urbansky as  Vasili Gubanov
 Sofia Pavlova as Anyuta Fokina
 Boris Smirnov as   Lenin
 Yevgeni Shutov as Fyodor Fokin
 Sergei Yakovlev as Denis Ivanovich
 Valentin Zubkov as Stepan
 V. Adlerov as Zimny
 Ivan Kashirin
 Viktor Kolpakov
 A. Smirnov
 Anatoliy Nikitin as Communist

References

External links 

1957 films
1957 drama films
Soviet drama films
Mosfilm films
Films about Vladimir Lenin
Russian Civil War films
1958 drama films
1958 films